"I Got Stung" is a 1958 song recorded by Elvis Presley and released as a single written by Aaron Schroeder and David Hill and published by Elvis Presley's company  Gladys Music, Inc. It was number one in the UK in 1959 and 2005 as a double A-side single.

Background
Clocking in at under two minutes, an upbeat, bouncy rock and roll number, it features some of Elvis' most rapid-fire vocals alongside humorous and catchy lyrics.

It was released as a double A-side with "One Night", reaching No. 1 in the UK where it stayed for three weeks.

Presley recorded this, his final song of the 1950s, on June 11, 1958, when he went to Nashville during his US Army stint, as he was preparing to set sail for Germany.

In the US, "I Got Stung" peaked at #8 on the Hot 100.

It was one of a number of Elvis Presley songs to be re-released in the United Kingdom in 2005 and it went to No. 1 again, in another double A-side release with "One Night".

Album appearances
The song appeared on the 1959 compilation 50,000,000 Elvis Fans Can't Be Wrong.

References

1958 singles
Elvis Presley songs
Number-one singles in Scotland
UK Singles Chart number-one singles
Songs written by Aaron Schroeder
Song recordings produced by Stephen H. Sholes
Songs written by David Hess
1958 songs